The 1985 Western Kentucky Hilltoppers football team represented Western Kentucky University as an independent during the 1985 NCAA Division I-AA football season. Led by second-year head coach Dave Roberts, the Hilltoppers compiled a record of 4–7.

Schedule

References

Western Kentucky Hilltoppers football seasons
Western Kentucky Hilltoppers football